The amplitude modulation signalling system (AMSS or the AM signalling system) is a digital system for adding low bit rate information to an analogue amplitude modulated broadcast signal in the same manner as the Radio Data System (RDS) for frequency modulated (FM) broadcast signals.

This system has been standardized in March 2006 by ETSI (TS 102 386) as an extension to the Digital Radio Mondiale (DRM) system.

Broadcasting 

AMSS data are broadcast from the following transmitters:

 LW
 RTL France: 234 kHz
 SW
 BBC World Service: 15.575 MHz

Formerly it was also used by:

 MW
 Truckradio 531 kHz
 BBC World Service: 648 kHz
 Deutschlandradio Kultur: 990 kHz

External links 
 
 ETSI TS 102 386 V1.2.1 (2006-03) directly from ETSI Publications Download Area (account or free registration required)
 
 

Radio technology
Broadcast engineering
2006 introductions
2006 establishments